Pushpinder Singh Chopra (30 September 1943 – 3 May 2021) was an Indian military historian and the author of several books, chiefly on military aviation history of India. He wrote extensively about the history of the Indian Air Force, from its inception in 1933 till present day. He was the founder editor of Vayu Aerospace and Defence Review, a bi-monthly aviation and defence magazine based in New Delhi, and the Society of Aerospace Studies. Singh was educated at The Doon School.

Singh died from COVID-19 in Gurgaon

Selected bibliography

References

External links
 Profile on The Peninsula Foundation

1943 births
Living people
People from Punjab, India
20th-century Indian historians
Indian male journalists
Indian military writers
Writers from Delhi
21st-century Indian historians
The Doon School alumni